A.C. Milan had a second consecutive disastrous season. Fabio Capello returned as coach, following the dismal second half of the 1996–97 league campaign, but failed to turn the corner, and Milan was a shadow of the team he had left the year before. With Capello's reputation seemingly ruined, he was sacked at the end of the season, with Milan finishing a mere 10th in the league.

First-team squad
Squad at end of season

Transfers

Autumn

Winter

Results

Serie A

League table

Results by round

Matches

Coppa Italia

Round of 32

Eightfinals

Quarter-finals

Semi-finals

Final

Statistics

Players statistics

Goalscorers

References

Sources
  RSSSF - Italy 1997/98

A.C. Milan seasons
Milan